Martín Andrés Giménez (born 30 September 1988) is an Argentine professional footballer who plays as a forward for Greek Super League 2 club Ierapetra.

Career
Giménez started his career in the youth of River Plate, he remained there for eight years before starting his senior career with Deportivo Armenio in 2007. After time with Deportivo Armenio, Giménez had spells with Leandro N. Alem and Atlas. A move to Primera B Nacional team Quilmes followed, he made eleven appearances in the 2011–12 season as Quilmes won promotion to the 2012–13 Argentine Primera División. Two appearances came in Argentina's top-flight for him before he departed to join Tristán Suárez of Primera B Metropolitana, but he left soon after to sign for Salvadoran Primera División club Santa Tecla in 2015.

He left Santa Tecla at the end of the following Apertura campaign. In 2016, Giménez completed a move to Primera B Metropolitana side Fénix. After four goals in thirty-two appearances for Fénix in Primera B Metropolitana, Giménez departed to move up a division to join Primera B Nacional side All Boys in September 2017. He scored on his All Boys debut in November against Agropecuario. Giménez left in 2018, prior to joining Colegiales in January 2019. He left in the succeeding June, having appeared twelve times. Giménez subsequently joined amateur club Melmac FC.

Career statistics
.

References

External links
 

1988 births
Living people
Sportspeople from Buenos Aires Province
Argentine footballers
Association football forwards
Argentine expatriate footballers
Expatriate footballers in El Salvador
Argentine expatriate sportspeople in El Salvador
Primera Nacional players
Argentine Primera División players
Primera B Metropolitana players
Club Atlético River Plate footballers
Deportivo Armenio footballers
Club Atlético Atlas footballers
Quilmes Atlético Club footballers
CSyD Tristán Suárez footballers
Santa Tecla F.C. footballers
Club Atlético Fénix players
All Boys footballers
Club Atlético Colegiales (Argentina) players